Neoprolochus is a monotypic genus of Sumatran long-jawed orb-weavers containing the single species, Neoprolochus jacobsoni. It was first described by E. Reimoser in 1927, based on a male found on Sumatra.

See also
 List of Tetragnathidae species

References

Monotypic Araneomorphae genera
Spiders of Asia
Tetragnathidae